The Ford Falcon (XE) is a full-size car that was produced by Ford Australia from 1982 until 1984. It was the second iteration of the fourth generation of the Falcon and also included the Ford Fairmont (XE)—the luxury-oriented version.

History 
Introduced on 11 March 1982, the XE was a revised version of the XD Falcon, which it replaced. Its external differences were restricted to a new nose, new rear bumper, and taillights. The biggest technical change was the introduction of a four link suspension system incorporating rear coil springs on the sedans. Wagons, utes and vans retained the rear semi-elliptical leaf springs as used on XD models. Up until 1991, the XE was Ford Australia's last V8-powered Falcon.

Powertrains 
The XE-series was introduced with a choice of five engines. 
 3.3-litre inline six-cylinder
 4.1-litre inline six-cylinder
 4.1-litre inline electronic fuel injected six-cylinder
 4.9-litre V8
 5.8-litre V8

Ford Australia built a quantity of 4-bolt 5.8 litre engines — similar to those used in NASCAR at the time — for race purposes in Australia. When the engine's local racing career ended at the end of 1984, the surplus stock was shipped and sold in the United States for use in DeTomaso Panteras as Detroit did not offer the 351 Cleveland engine anymore. The last Australian manufactured Cleveland V8-powered Ford Falcon passenger car was a silver  Ford Fairmont (XE) Ghia ESP sedan, VIN # JG32AR33633K, in November 1982 (although Ford promoted this car as the "Last V8" there were a number of V8 XE Falcons produced after this build number).

Manual transmission was available in 3-speed column shift and in the more common 4-speed floor shift. Automatic transmission was 3-speed, floor shift in 5-seater configurations and column shift in 6-seater units. Automatic was more common than manual, even though it was at extra cost in the GL and lesser range of vehicles.

The XE was the first Falcon to be offered with a 5-speed manual transmission, but only when packaged with the base 3.3 litre engine.

Model range 
The XE range consisted of nine models marketed as follows:
 Falcon utility
 Falcon van
 Falcon GL ute
 Falcon GL van
 Falcon GL sedan
 Falcon GL wagon
 Fairmont sedan
 Fairmont wagon
 Fairmont Ghia sedan

A new version of Ford's S-Pack option was available for Falcon GL sedan, wagon, ute and van (all then badged as Falcon S) whilst a new version of the European Sports Pack (ESP) option also remained on offer for the Fairmont Ghia sedan.

Limited edition models followed, including the GL-based Falcon X-Pak sedan and wagon in late 1982, the Fairmont Ghia Limited Edition sedan in late 1983 and the GL-based Falcon Eclipse sedan and wagon in early 1984.

European Sports Pack (ESP)

The XE Fairmont Ghia ESP (option 54) was an optional pack that was chosen by the purchaser when ordering their new car, it varied in trim, styles and motors. Examples of ESP upgrades are, two-tone Charcoal-accented paint or base Ghia paint, Scheel-brand front bucket seats or Ghia Seats,   Cleveland V8 or  EFI Crossflow, 3 speed C4 auto or 4 speed single rail manual. Most ESP optioned Ghias are easily distinguishable from the Fairmont Ghia, however, many Option 54 Fairmont Ghias look so similar to the Fairmont Ghia that most owners of a used example do not realise they have an ESP as there is no code on the compliance plate to distinguish this. The only way to ascertain if a Fairmont Ghia is a genuine ESP is to contact Ford Australia with the compliance details and have the vehicles original purchase order examined for "option 54". The only common components of an XE ESP were the differential and rear brakes, "Option 54" included LSD and rear disc brakes as standard.

All 1982 built XE ESP 's were two toned with front/rear/side orange body moulds with Scheel Seats optioned in two colours one in Gun Metal Grey and the second in Sierra Tan in Colour with gold snowflake wheels.
Build numbers on 1982 V8 XE ESPs total to 538 build as there is no numbers on the 6 cylinder XE ESP's numbers estimate at 200 or less.
351 – 178 (Manual optioned only)
302 – 100 (Manual)
302 – 260 (Auto)
Total – 538 Build V8 XE. ESP's

Although the car was named European Sports Pack (ESP) as Ford had dropped the GT brand due to insurance purposes the XE ESP V8 Falcons were essentially an '80s model GT Falcon. With the Cleveland being dropped in 1982 Ford continued the production in the 1983/1984 XE ESP with a single-toned coloured car with a 6-cylinder EFI motor which exterior paint of car looked same to the XE Ghia but the Scheel, a Gunmetal interior, remained in the XE ESP along with its gold Snowflake wheels. These were and are a true muscle car of the '80s which are very desirable and rare to find today.

XE Phase 6

Wayne Draper, designer of the XD and XE Falcons at Ford, was also the designer of the aftermarket based Phase 5 XD Falcon using his HO Phase Autos'' business in the early eighties. When Ford abandoned HO, Draper bought the rights to the HO name. HO Phase Autos were the original manufacturers of the aerodynamic kits for the Group C racing Falcons.

The Series 1 XE Phase 6 was altered for racing, like the Phase 5 XD, to comply with CAMS regulations. Ford had to remove the original wing and replaced it with the DJR racing rear air dam that created more drag to fit regulations.

The Series 2 XE Phase 6 is cosmetically updated with mirrors and door trims from the later XF Falcon.

Market and reception 
The XE Falcon / ZK Fairlane / FD LTD range of cars combined to become the first automobiles to receive a prestigious Australian Design Award.

As the fuel crisis eased, Australians moved away from the smaller Holden Commodore back to the traditional full-size Falcon. In 1982, for the first time in more than a decade, the Falcon eclipsed its Holden rival in terms of annual sales, and remained Australia's number one selling car until 1988.

Production totalled 193,890 units  prior to the replacement of the XE by the XF Falcon in October 1984.

Motorsport 
Dick Johnson won the 1984 Australian Touring Car Championship behind the wheel of a Group C specification  XE Falcon sedan, commonly known as "Greens Tuf" (due to the cars green paint and the name of one of the steel products from the main sponsor – Palmer Tube Mills). It is now part of the David Bowden collection.

Sydney based driver Steve Masterton also used an XE Falcon to win the Amaroo Park based AMSCAR Series in 1984.

References 

XE
Cars of Australia
Cars introduced in 1982
XE Falcon
Sedans
Station wagons
Coupé utilities
Vans
Rear-wheel-drive vehicles
1980s cars
Cars discontinued in 1984